James Wynn (1910–1986) was an English footballer who played as an inside forward for several clubs, and was a prolific goal scorer for Rochdale.

Wynn died on 26 May 1986.

References

1910 births
1986 deaths
English footballers
Association football forwards
English Football League players
Blyth Spartans A.F.C. players
Wallsend F.C. players
Sheffield Wednesday F.C. players
Southport F.C. players
Rotherham United F.C. players
Rochdale A.F.C. players
Scunthorpe United F.C. players